The National Advance Party was a political party in Papua New Guinea.

The party won one seat at the 2007 general election, with the return of John Pundari, who had been defeated for the  Papua New Guinea Revival Party in 2002.

The party was deregistered in 2008 after merging with the People's Party in April of that year, with Pundari continuing as a member of that party.

References

Defunct political parties in Papua New Guinea